The Deutscher Tischtennis-Verband (DTTV) was the governing body for table tennis in the German Democratic Republic. It was a constituent sports association within the larger Deutscher Turn- und Sportbund, which was the primary sports authority in the country and a part of the National Front. Shortly after German reunification in 1990, the DTTV was absorbed by the German Table Tennis Association (DTTB).

See also
Deutscher Turn- und Sportbund
Sports associations (East Germany)

References

Sports governing bodies in East Germany
Sports organizations established in 1958
Organizations disestablished in 1990
1958 establishments in East Germany
1990 disestablishments in Germany